The Addison Gallery of American Art is an academic museum dedicated to collecting American art, organized as a department of Phillips Academy in Andover, Massachusetts.

History 
Directors of the gallery include Bartlett H. Hayes, Jr. (1940–1969), Christopher C. Cook (1969–1989), Jock Reynolds (1989–1998), Adam D. Weinberg (1999–2003), Brian T. Allen (2004–2013), Judith F. Dolkart (2014–2019), and Allison N. Kemmerer (2021-).

In the spring of 2006, the Phillips Academy Board of Trustees approved a $30 million campaign to renovate and expand the Addison Gallery. Construction on the Addison began in the middle of 2008 and was completed in 2010. The project was designed by Centerbrook Architects & Planners.

Collection 

The Addison Gallery of American Art's founding collection included major works by such prominent American artists as John Singleton Copley, Thomas Eakins, Winslow Homer, Maurice Prendergast, John Singer Sargent, John Twachtman, and James McNeill Whistler. Purchasing and generous gifts have added works by such artists as George Bellows, Alexander Calder, Stuart Davis, Arthur Dove, Marsden Hartley, Hans Hofmann, Edward Hopper, Knox Martin, Georgia O'Keeffe, Jackson Pollock, Frederic Remington, Charles Sheeler, Frank Stella, John Sloan, Benjamin West and Andrew Wyeth. It also has paintings by John Kensett, Frederic Church, George Inness, Dwight Tryon, Ralph Blakelock, John Singer Sargent, Josef Albers, Mary Cassatt, and Phillip Guston.

The Addison's collection of 7,500 photographs spans the history of American photography and includes in-depth holdings of key individual artists, such as Lewis Baltz, Walker Evans, Robert Frank, Eadweard Muybridge, Carleton Watkins, Margaret Bourke-White, and Ansel Adams. In recent years, the Gallery has acquired significant contemporary works by Emery Bopp, Carroll Dunham, Kerry James Marshall, Joel Shapiro, and Lorna Simpson.

, the collection comprises over 22,000 works in all media, including painting, sculpture, photography, drawings, prints, and decorative arts from the eighteenth century to the present. It also has a collection of models of American ships, including the Half Moon, Mayflower, and the yacht Wanderer.

Exhibitions 
The Gallery presents a combination of twelve temporary exhibitions and permanent collection installations per year. Recent examples include: 

American Vanguards: Graham, Davis, Gorky, De Kooning and Their Circle (2012)

An American in London: Whistler and the Thames (2014)

Laurie Simmons: in and Around the House (2016)

Mark Tobey: Threading Light (2017)

Rosamond Purcell: Nature Stands Aside ( Sept. 2022)

Gallery

References

Further reading

External links

Addison Gallery of American Art official site
 

Phillips Academy
Museums of American art
Art museums and galleries in Massachusetts
Museums in Essex County, Massachusetts
1931 establishments in Massachusetts
Art museums established in 1931